Simplex may refer to:

Mathematics
Simplex, a term in geometry meaning an n-dimensional analogue of a triangle
Pascal's simplex, a version of Pascal's triangle of more than three dimensions
Simplex algorithm, a popular algorithm for numerical solution of linear programming problems
Simplex graph, derived from the cliques of another graph
Simplex noise, a method for constructing an n-dimensional noise function
Simplex plot, a ternary plot used in game theory

Companies and trade names
Simplex (bicycle), a French bicycle derailleur brand
Simplex Manufacturing Corporation, an American manufacturer of motorcycles in Louisiana from 1935 to 1975
American Simplex, an American automobile made in Mishawaka, Indiana, US
Simplex Automobile Company was a defunct luxury car manufacturer from 1907 to 1921.
Crane-Simplex, a defunct luxury car manufacturer in New York, US at the start of the 20th century
Sheffield-Simplex, a British vehicle manufacturer operating 1907–1920
Simplex Typewriter Company, an index typewriter manufacturer
A trade name used by British railway locomotive manufacturers The Motor Rail & Tramcar Co Ltd
The trade name of the swinging-tray record changer used in Wurlitzer jukeboxes from the 1930s to the 1950s
A brand of fire alarm systems made by SimplexGrinnell
A manufacturer of jacks used in railroads and mining industries, now owned by Actuant Corporation

Technology
Bergmann Simplex, an early 20th-century, German-made handgun
Simplex communication, a one-way communications channel
Simplex signaling, signalling in which two conductors are used for a single channel
Simplex, using a single frequency for transmit and receive instead of an amateur radio repeater
SimpleX Messaging Protocol, a privacy focused messaging protocol
Small Innovative Missions for Planetary Exploration (SIMPLEx) program at NASA; see Lunar Polar Hydrogen Mapper and Q-PACE

Other uses
List of species named simplex, a common species name
Mercedes Simplex, an automobile model produced between 1902 and 1909
Herpes simplex, a viral disease caused by Herpes simplex viruses
Simplex printing, printing one sided pages, a technique that is contrast to duplex printing